Sixth Republic may refer to:

Governments
 Sixth Brazilian Republic (1985–present)
 Sixth Republic of Korea (1987–present)
 Sixth Republic of Niger (2009–2010)

See also

 First Republic
 Second Republic
 Third Republic
 Fourth Republic
 Fifth Republic
 Seventh Republic